Spencer Smith may refer to:

Spencer Smith (musician) (born 1987), American founding member and drummer of the band Panic! at the Disco
Spencer Smith (triathlete) (born 1973), British triathlete
Spencer Smith (Big Brother) (born 1979), contestant in Big Brother UK
John Spencer Smith (1769–1845), British diplomat, politician and writer
Spencer-Smith, a surname